The Laurel Police Department (LPD) is a nationally accredited, full-service police department servicing a population of 21,945 persons within  of the municipality of Laurel in the U.S. state of Maryland in Prince Georges County. The LPD also maintains its own emergency communications (dispatch) and temporary prisoner detention facility.

Organization
 Patrol is the largest and most visible component of the Laurel Police.  The Patrol Division is made up of six patrol squads, each of which is overseen by a Sergeant with assistance from Corporals.  Officers respond for all calls for service within the city as well as conduct area checks, investigate any suspicious activities, and enforce motor vehicle laws. Motors Units also fall under the patrol division.  
 K9 units are assigned to patrol squads to assist with a variety of situations to include narcotics detection and assistance in apprehending fleeing suspects.
 Criminal Investigations Division is composed of detectives who investigate major crimes within the city that require further time and investigation beyond a normal patrol response.
 Community Engagement Unit is the agency's community policing unit.  Officers attend homeowner meetings, oversee DARE, and address many other community concerns, as well as monitor speed enforcement cameras.
 Emergency Response Team is the department's SWAT team.  The team is decentralized, meaning team members work a normal post such as patrol or CID and assume ERT duties when the team is called to action.
 The Community Action Team investigates narcotics and vice crimes.

Equipment
Officers are issued SIG Sauer P320 9mm Pistol, Oleoresin Capsicum spray, ASP expandable batons, TASER 7, radio, and handcuffs. Vehicles are primarily the Ford Expolorer with Federal Signal Valor LED lightbars.

See also

 List of law enforcement agencies in Maryland
 Prince George's County
 Prince George's County Police
 Prince George's County Sheriff's Office

References

External links
 Laurel Police Department official website 
 City of Laurel official homepage

Laurel
Laurel, Maryland